Graphium mullah  is a species of butterfly in the family Papilionidae. It is found  in China, Laos,   Vietnam, Japan and  Taiwan.

Subspecies
G. m. mullah  (Alphéraky 1897) (China, Taiwan and Japan)
G. m. kooichii Morita, 1996 (Laos)
G. m.timur Ney, 1911 ("Ta-tsien-lu", China)

References
Devyatkin, A. L.; Monastyrskii, A. L. (2003) New taxa and new records of butterflies from Vietnam, 2. Atalanta 34 (1/2): 75-109, (11 figs.), 262-271 (pls. 5–9).

External links
Indochina butterflies Images, data

mullah
Butterflies of Indochina
Butterflies of Asia
Butterflies described in 1897